Ronald George Calhoun (24 June 1933 – 7 February 2020), born in Byron, Ontario, was a Canadian non-profit executive.

Career
Calhoun was the National Co-ordinator for the Terry Fox Marathon of Hope, working with Fox to organize the original run in 1980. He coined the phrase "Marathon of Hope" for the event.

Calhoun has served in numerous other positions in charitable and educational organizations, including:
National Fundraising Chairman at the Canadian Cancer Society
member of the national board of directors at the ALS Society of Canada
Ontario chair of the Canadian Diabetes Association
chair of the Mogenson Trust in Physiology, University of Western Ontario
London, Ontario-branch vice president of the Canadian Mental Health Association
executive director of Partners in Research

Recognition
Certificate of Merit from the Canadian Cancer Society, 1977
honorary life membership in the Canadian Cancer Society, 1987
General Motors of Canada Gold Award, 1980
Ontario Medal for Good Citizenship, 1996
Queen Elizabeth II Golden Jubilee Medal, 2002
entry in Canadian Who's Who, 2004
Doctor of Laws (honoris causa) from The University of Western Ontario, 2011
first recipient and namesake of the Ronald G. Calhoun Science Ambassador Award (Partners in Research), 2012
Queen Elizabeth II Diamond Jubilee Medal, 2012

References

External links
Biography of Ron Calhoun

1933 births
2020 deaths
Businesspeople from London, Ontario
Canadian nonprofit executives